Steve Bernal is a retired American soccer player who played professionally in the USL A-League.

Bernal graduated from Batavia High School.  He attended Creighton University, playing on the men's soccer team from 1996 to 1999.  In February 2000, the Dallas Burn selected Bernal in the third round (34th overall) of the 2000 MLS SuperDraft  He attended three weeks of the Burn's pre-season training, then returned to Creighton to complete his degree.  He eventually signed with the Milwaukee Rampage for the 2000 A-League season.  In July 2000, the Chicago Fire called up Bernal for two exhibition games.  On August 26, 2000, the Dallas Burn signed Bernal to a one-year contract.  He made several game-day rosters, but never came off the bench.  On February 16, 2001, Dallas waived Bernal.  Bernal returned to the Milwaukee Rampage where he played for the next two seasons.  In July 2001, the Chicago Fire called up Bernal, but he again never came off the bench.  In 2002, the Rampage won the A-League championship, but ceased operations that winter.  On March 14, 2003, Bernal signed with the Milwaukee Wave United where he played for only one season.

References

External links
 

Living people
1978 births
American soccer players
Creighton Bluejays men's soccer players
Chicago Fire FC players
FC Dallas draft picks
Milwaukee Rampage players
Milwaukee Wave United players
A-League (1995–2004) players
Association football midfielders
Association football defenders
Soccer players from Illinois